Rehoboth Methodist Church is a historic Methodist church located near Skinnersville, Washington County, North Carolina. It was built between 1850 and 1853, and is a one-story, temple-form, Greek Revival style frame structure with a front gable roof. It is sheathed in weatherboard and has a pair of double-door entrances.

It was listed on the National Register of Historic Places in 1976.

References

Methodist churches in North Carolina
Churches on the National Register of Historic Places in North Carolina
Churches completed in 1853
Greek Revival church buildings in North Carolina
19th-century Methodist church buildings in the United States
Churches in Washington County, North Carolina
National Register of Historic Places in Washington County, North Carolina
Wooden churches in North Carolina